Instrument panel may refer to:
Control panel (engineering)
Flight instruments
Dashboard